Dennis Anthony Butler (born 24 June 1944) is an English former football player and manager. He played as a winger for Bolton Wanderers between 1959 and 1968, before ending his playing career following a five-year spell at Rochdale. Later working as a coach and assistant manager, he spent an unsuccessful time as Port Vale manager between 1978 and 1979.

Playing career
Dennis played for Leigh Grammar School and Atherton Schoolboys before joining Bolton Wanderers at the age of 15 in 1959. He spent nine years with the club, racking up 65 appearances. Dennis made his debut under Bill Ridding in December 1963 at Aston Villa. The following week he made a winning Burnden Park debut against the great Tottenham Hotspur side before scoring his first league goal at Arsenal in January 1964. At the end of the 1963–64 season the "Trotters" were relegated out of the First Division. He was an ever-present until a bad cartilage injury in October 1964, which kept him out of football for nearly a year. Butler made occasional appearances for Bolton before moving on to Rochdale in 1968, who won promotion out of the Fourth Division in 1968–69. He was signed by Bob Stokoe and spent over six years with Rochdale playing 156 league games, and scoring 36 goals before his early retirement as a player in 1973.

Managerial career
Following his retirement as a player, he coached at Rochdale and Bury. He was made assistant manager at Port Vale under Bobby Smith in November 1977. After Smith's departure to Swindon Town, he became manager for the 1978–79 season. The "Valiants" finished 16th in the Fourth Division and later he left by mutual consent in August 1979. He had signed popular player Bernie Wright from Bradford City for £9,000, however most of his big money signings had torrid times at Vale Park. He signed right-back Neil Wilkinson (free), Ken Todd (a club-record £37,000 signing despite only having made a handful of appearances for Wolverhampton Wanderers), Gerry Keenan (£15,000), Felix Healy (£8,000), Kevin Tully (£3,000 plus Neil Wilkinson), Andy Proudlove (£1,000), Peter Farrell (breaking the club-record again at £40,000), and Bob Delgado (£30,000). To finance these signings, he sold John Froggatt (£8,000), Mick Moore (£2,000), Terry Bailey (£2,000), Ken Beamish (£35,000), and John Ridley (£55,000). After his team were booed he called the fans 'a bunch of yobs'. Vale recorded a £52,000 loss despite a remarkable £225,000 income from the club's commercial department. Butler's transfer dealings had lost the club £36,000, whilst wages more than doubled from £113,000 to £259,000. After leaving Burslem, Butler then reunited with Bobby Smith at Swindon, becoming the first team coach before retiring from football in 1980.

Career statistics

Managerial statistics

Honours
Rochdale
Football League Fourth Division third-place promotion: 1968–69

References

1944 births
Living people
Sportspeople from Macclesfield
English footballers
Association football wingers
Bolton Wanderers F.C. players
Rochdale A.F.C. players
English Football League players
English football managers
Port Vale F.C. managers
English Football League managers
Association football coaches
Rochdale A.F.C. non-playing staff
Bury F.C. non-playing staff
Port Vale F.C. non-playing staff
Swindon Town F.C. non-playing staff